Fresh Outta 'P' University is a 1997 studio album by former P-Funk bassist Bootsy Collins. The album was originally released by the WEA/Black Culture label in Europe and Japan and then by Private I records (distributed by Mercury Records) in the U.S.. The album features a number of guest musicians and performers, including MC Lyte, Rodney O, D Meka, Thomas D and Smudo and Fatboy Slim.

Numerous versions

Since its initial release in 1997, "Fresh Outta 'P' University" has appeared in several different configurations. These configurations include:

The deluxe 2-CD European version (WEA/Black Culture 3984 20396-2) which is contained in a special CD case that opens up into six panels that spells out the name "Bootsy".

The 2-CD Japanese "New Edition" (WPCR-10370~1) which features the entire album on disc one, and remixes of "Party-Lick-A-Ble's" and "Do The Freak" on disc two.

Track listing

U.S. VERSION

"Off Da Hook"
"I'm Leavin' U"  
"Funk Ain't Broke"  
"Party Lick-A-Ble's"  
"Ever Lost Your Lover"  
"Pearl Drops"  
"Do The Freak"  
"Fragile (So Sensitive)"  
"Shiggy Wiggy"  
"Wind Me Up" 
"Good-N-Nasty"  
"Penetration"  
"I'm Leavin' U (Gotta Go Gotta Go)" (House Mix) 
"Fresh Outta 'P'"  
"Jazz-N-Yo-Shiggy" 'Dance Mix'

EUROPEAN VERSION

"Off Da Hook"  
"I'm Leavin' U"  
"Funk Ain't Broke"  
"Party Lick-A-Ble's"  
"Ever Lost Your Lover"  
"Pearl Drops"  
"Do The Freak"  
"Fragile (So Sensitive)"  
"Holly-Wood-If-She-Could"
"Wind Me Up"  
"Good-N-Nasty"  
"Penetration (In Funk We Trust)"  
"Home-Of-Da Freaks"
"Fresh Outta 'P'"

Personnel

Guitars - Ron Jennings, Garry Shider, Wilbur Longmire, Fan Fan La Tulipe, Boogieman
Keyboards - Bernie Worrell, Johnny Davis, Bootsy Collins, Anthony Cole, Joel Johnson, Greg Fitz, Joel Johnson, Mousse T
Horns - Fred Wesley, Allan Barnes, Dwight Adams, Ed Jones, Chris de'Margary, Avi Leibovich, Duncan Mackay
Drums - Tony Byrd, Bootsy Collins
Vibraharp - Vincent Monatana
Vocals - Gary Cooper, Henry Benefield, Michael Gatheright, Inaya Davis, Kristen Gray, Melanie Eiland, Garry Shider, Linda Shider, Michael Anthony, April Woods, Kyle Jason, Bootsy Collins, William Hagan, Phil Brown and Gospel Group, Mike Marshall, Herbert, Cash, Nathalie, Eugen, Caspar, and Terry
Rappers - Be-Wise, Rodney O, MC Lyte, Omeka Sykes, Dru Down, Da Lesson, Ono, Da Brixx, Eugen, Caspar, AJ, Gizmo, Teray

References 

 

1997 albums
Bootsy Collins albums